Florence Township is one of twenty townships in Benton County, Iowa, USA.  As of the 2000 census, its population was 2,258.

Geography
According to the United States Census Bureau, Florence Township covers an area of 36.33 square miles (94.09 square kilometers).

Cities, towns, villages
 Norway
 Walford (west half)

Adjacent townships
 Fremont Township (north)
 Clinton Township, Linn County (northeast)
 Fairfax Township, Linn County (east)
 Monroe Township, Johnson County (southeast)
 Lenox Township, Iowa County (south)
 Washington Township, Iowa County (southwest)
 St. Clair Township (west)
 Eldorado Township (northwest)

Cemeteries
The township contains these two cemeteries: Norway and Saint Michaels.

Major highways
  U.S. Route 151

School districts
 Benton Community School District
 College Community School District

Political districts
 Iowa's 3rd congressional district
 State House District 39
 State Senate District 20

References
 United States Census Bureau 2007 TIGER/Line Shapefiles
 United States Board on Geographic Names (GNIS)
 United States National Atlas

External links

 
US-Counties.com
City-Data.com

Townships in Benton County, Iowa
Cedar Rapids, Iowa metropolitan area
Townships in Iowa